Elvis! Elvis! is a 1977 Swedish drama film directed by Kay Pollak. It was entered into the 10th Moscow International Film Festival.

Plot
Elvis Karlsson is named after his mother's idol Elvis Presley. He finds it difficult to live up to her demands and has to fight to become a human being in his own right.

Cast
 Lele Dorazio as Elvis
 Lena-Pia Bernhardsson as Elvis' Mamma
 Fred Gunnarsson as Elvis' Father
 Elisaveta as Elvis' Grandmother
 Allan Edwall as Elvis' Grandfather
 Kent Andersson as Brovall
 Victoria Grant as Anna-Rosa Pettersson
 Kim Anderzon as Anna-Rosa's Mother
 Kjerstin Dellert as Anna-Rosa's Grandmother
 Svea Holst as Anna-Rosa's Great Grandmother
 Ingrid Boström as Teacher
 Lars Edström as Kurt
 Marian Gräns as Sivan

References

External links
 
 

1977 films
1977 drama films
Swedish drama films
1970s Swedish-language films
Films directed by Kay Pollak
Films scored by Ralph Lundsten
1970s Swedish films